In enzymology, a formylmethionine deformylase is an enzyme that catalyzes the chemical reaction

N-formyl-L-methionine + H2O  formate + L-methionine

Thus, the two substrates of this enzyme are N-formyl-L-methionine and H2O, whereas its two products are formate and L-methionine.

This enzyme belongs to the family of hydrolases, those acting on carbon-nitrogen bonds other than peptide bonds, specifically in linear amides.  The systematic name of this enzyme class is N-formyl-L-methionine amidohydrolase. This enzyme participates in methionine metabolism and glyoxylate and dicarboxylate metabolism.

Structural studies

References

 

EC 3.5.1
Enzymes of known structure